Urban Legend is the third studio album by American rapper T.I., released on November 30, 2004, through Grand Hustle Records and Atlantic Records. The album debuted at number seven on the US Billboard 200, selling 195,000 copies in its first week of release. It also debuted at number one on the Top R&B/Hip-Hop Albums and the Top Rap Albums charts.

The album's official lead single, "Bring Em Out", was released on October 19, 2004 and became T.I. first's top 10 hit, peaking at number nine on the US Billboard Hot 100 chart, while the second single, "U Don't Know Me", peaked at number 23 on the chart. The third single, "ASAP", reached number 75 on the chart, number 18 on the Hot R&B/Hip-Hop Songs and number 14 on the Hot Rap Tracks charts. T.I. created a video for "ASAP"/"Motivation". However, "Motivation" only made it to number 62 on the Hot R&B/Hip-Hop Songs chart music chart.

The album features production provided by longtime collaborating producers DJ Toomp, Jazze Pha, Lil Jon, The Neptunes, Nick "Fury" Loftin, David Banner and Sanchez Holmes. New producers contributing to the album include Daz Dillinger, Kevin "Khao" Cates, KLC, Mannie Fresh, Scott Storch and Swizz Beatz. Featured guests on the album include Trick Daddy, Nelly, Lil Jon, B.G., Mannie Fresh, Daz Dillinger, Lil Wayne, Pharrell Williams, P$C, Jazze Pha and Lil' Kim.

Background
In March 2004, a warrant was issued for T.I.'s arrest after a violation of probation that resulted from a 1997 arrest on cocaine distribution and the manufacturing and distribution of a controlled substance. He was sentenced to three years in prison. While imprisoned in Cobb County, Georgia, he filmed an unauthorized music video.

Recording
After T.I. received his sentence, he was granted a work release program that allowed him to continue making music and proceeded to record several albums' worth of material. Recording sessions took place at P.S. West Studios, Silent Sounds Studios, and Stankonia Studios, all located in T.I.'s native Atlanta, Georgia. One recording session took place at the Orange Grove Studios in Los Angeles, California.

Release and promotion

Singles
"Bring Em Out" was the first official single to be released from Urban Legend. The single entered the US Billboard Hot 100 chart at number nine, it also charted at number six on the Hot R&B/Hip-Hop Songs chart, and at number four on the Hot Rap Tracks music chart. In the United Kingdom the single entered the UK Singles Chart music chart at number 59. "Bring Em Out" became T.I.'s first top-ten single to enter the Billboard Hot 100 chart. "Bring Em Out" was certified gold by the RIAA for sales of over 500,000 copies in the US.

"U Don't Know Me" was the second official single from the album. It entered the US Billboard Hot 100 chart at number 23. It charted at number six on the Hot R&B/Hip-Hop Songs chart, number four on the Hot Rap Tracks chart, and number 65 on the Pop 100 music chart. The song was nominated for Best Rap Solo Performance at the Grammy Awards, Best Rap Video at the MTV Video Music Awards and Street Anthem of the Year at the Vibe Awards. It was certified platinum by the RIAA for selling over a million copies in the US.

"ASAP" was the third and final official single from the album. It entered the Billboard Hot 100 chart at number 75. It charted at number 18 on the Hot R&B/Hip-Hop Songs chart and at number 14 on the Hot Rap Tracks chart. It was certified gold by the RIAA for selling over 500,000 copies in the US. On the B-side of the single the song "Motivation" appeared, which charted at number 62 on the Hot R&B/Hip-Hop Songs music chart.

Critical reception

Upon its release, Urban Legend received generally favorable reviews from most music critics. Allmusic writer Andy Kellman opined that, "With all that chaos surrounding T.I., it's disappointing to hear him retracing his steps, rewriting old lines, developing with little progress. Perhaps it's asking too much to expect T.I. to show as much growth here as he did on Trap Muzik, but -- as is the case with Jadakiss -- remaining patient for that classic album (and you know he has one in him) is getting tough." Chuck Mindehall of Entertainment Weekly, in his review of the album, wrote, "when [T.I.] declares "I'm the King," you just about believe him." Tom Breihan of the Baltimore City Paper stated that although "T.I.’s flow is more focused and confident than it was on his 2003 breakthrough, Trap Muzik [...] the new album feels like a thrown-together collection instead of a unified work." Steve 'Flash' Juon of RapReviews stated that "If [T.I.] can stay clean and out of prison [...]  there seems to be no limit to how far he can go."

Commercial performance
Urban Legend debuted at number seven on the US Billboard 200 chart, selling 195,000 copies in its first week. This became T.I.'s second US top-ten debut and first to top the latter. The album also debuted at number one on the US Top R&B/Hip-Hop Albums chart. On March 3, 2005, the album was certified platinum by the Recording Industry Association of America (RIAA), for sales of over a million copies in the United States.

Track listing

Samples
"Tha King"
"King Of Rock" and "Hit It Run" by Run-DMC
"Prayin for Help"
"When I'm Gone" by The Jones Girls
"Why U Mad at Me"
"Bumpy's Lament" by Isaac Hayes
Get Loose
"Ready Or Not Here I Come (Can't Hide From Love)" by The Delfonics
"Bring Em Out"
"What More Can I Say" by Jay-Z
"Limelight"
"I'll Never Let You Go" by The Sylvers

Personnel
Credits for Urban Legend adapted from Allmusic.

 Kori Anders - Mixing Assistant
 Big Kuntry King - Performer
 Leslie Brathwaite - Engineer, Mixing
 Greg Gigendad Burke - Art Direction, Design
 Mike Caren - A&R, Engineer
 Chris Carmouche - Engineer, Mixing Assistant
 Kevin Cates - Producer
 Jeremiah Claudius - Assistant Tracking Engineer
 Andrew Coleman - Engineer
 Kevin Crouse - Mixing
 Lavell Crump - Producer
 Daz Dillinger - Producer
 DJ Toomp - Producer
 Mannie Fresh - Producer
 Fury - Producer
 Brian "Big Bass" Gardener - Mastering
 Jason Geter - A&R, Assistant Engineer, Executive Producer
 Sanchez "RockHead" Holmes - Engineer, Producer
 Cameron Huff - Engineer
 Hannah Kang - A&R
 KLC - Audio Production, Producer
 Lil Jon - Audio Production, Producer
 James Lopez - Marketing

 Tony Love - Bass, Guitar
 Jonathan Mannion - Photography
 Josh McDonnell - Mixing Assistant
 Khary Menelik - Mixing Assistant
 The Neptunes - Producer
 Zack Odom - Engineer
 Peaches - Stylist
 John Pirretti - Mixing Assistant
 P$C - Performer
 Bryan Pugh - Mixing Assistant
 Ray Seay - Mixing
 Cyrus Shamir - Engineer
 Nico Solis - Mixing Assistant, Track Engineer
 Scott Storch - Audio Production, Producer
 Storty B - Producer
 Supa Engineer - Mixing
 Swizz Beatz - Audio Production, Producer
 T.I.P. - Executive Producer
 Phil Tan - Mixing
 Tom Tapley - Assistant Engineer
 Chris Theis - Mixing
 Corey Williams - Engineer
 John Frye-Mixing Engineer

Charts

Weekly charts

Year-end charts

Certifications

References

External links
 Urban Legend at Discogs

2004 albums
Albums produced by DJ Toomp
Albums produced by David Banner
Albums produced by Daz Dillinger
Albums produced by Jazze Pha
Albums produced by Mannie Fresh
Albums produced by Scott Storch
Albums produced by Swizz Beatz
Albums produced by the Neptunes
T.I. albums
Atlantic Records albums
Grand Hustle Records albums